Exit Music: Songs with Radio Heads is a tribute album to British band Radiohead released in 2006 on Rapster Records and Barely Breaking Even Records. The album features reworked songs from Mark Ronson, Alex Greenwald of Phantom Planet, Sia, Matthew Herbert, Sa-Ra, The Cinematic Orchestra, RJD2 and many others.

Track listing
"No Surprises" – Shawn Lee
"Morning Bell" – The Randy Watson Experience featuring Donn
"In Limbo" – Sa-Ra featuring Sa-Ra All Stars
"High and Dry" – Pete Kuzma featuring Bilal
"Just" – Mark Ronson featuring Alex Greenwald
"Airbag" – RJD2
"(Nice Dream)" – Matthew Herbert featuring Mara Carlyle	
"Blow Out" – LO Freq
"The National Anthem" – Me'Shell Ndegéocello & Chris Dave
"Karma Police" – The Bad Plus
"Paranoid Android" – Sia
"Everything in Its Right Place" – Osunlade featuring Erro
"Knives Out" – Waajeed of Platinum Pied Pipers featuring Monica Blaire
"Exit Music (For a Film)" – The Cinematic Orchestra

See also
 Radiodread

Notes

References

External links
Rapster Records Page
Barely Breaking Even Records Page

Radiohead tribute albums
2006 compilation albums
Rock compilation albums
Barely Breaking Even compilation albums